The Saudi Center for Organ Transplantation (SCOT), previously known as the National Kidney Foundation (Saudi), until it was renamed in 1993, is a centre for the transplantation of organs in the Kingdom of Saudi Arabia. Its Director General is Talal Algoufi.

References

External links 
 Official website

Transplant organizations